The 2014 Singapore Charity Shield was the 7th Singapore Charity Shield, 21 February 2014 at Jalan Besar Stadium, between the winners of the previous season's 2013 S.League and 2013 Singapore Cup competitions. The match was contested by the champions of the 2013 S.League, Tampines Rovers, and the 2013 Singapore Cup winners, Home United.

Tampines Rovers won the Shield for a record 4th time in consecutive seasons after a 1–0 win over Home United, with Miljan Mrdaković scoring the only goal.

Match

Details

See also
2014 S.League
2014 Singapore Cup
2014 Singapore League Cup

References

2014 in Singaporean football
2014 in Singapore